Rescue comprises responsive operations that usually involve the saving of life, or the urgent treatment of injuries after an accident or a dangerous situation.

Tools used might include search and rescue dogs, mounted search and rescue horses, helicopters, the "jaws of life", and other hydraulic cutting and spreading tools used to extricate individuals from wrecked vehicles.  Rescue operations are sometimes supported by rescue vehicles operated by rescue squads.

Rescue is a potent theme in human psychology, both from mortal perils and moral perils, and is often treated in fiction, with the rescue of a damsel in distress being a notable trope. Psychoanalyst Sigmund Freud introduced the concept of "rescue fantasies" by men pursuing "fallen women" in his 1910 work "A Special Type of Choice of Object Made by Men"; Freud's insight into this aspect of male psychology might retain merit, though his proposed Oedipus complex used to frame this concept is no longer in vogue. Within the practice of psychoanalysis, the term has taken on the additional sense concerning therapists' desire to 'rescue' their clients.

Historically, rescue could refer to an act of property seizure in service of an unpaid debt. For example, there is record of a countryman living in the vicinity of present-day Wythenshawe being prosecuted in a local court for "making rescue" of a pig which had been seized as a distress for non-payment of money owed.

Disjoint basket of related topics and concepts
Ropes and special devices can reach and remove individuals and animals from difficult locations including:
 Aeronautical and maritime search and rescue
 Cave rescue
 Combat search and rescue
 Confined space rescue
 Helicopter rescue basket
 Hostage rescue
 Mine rescue
 Mountain rescue
 Rope rescue
 Search and rescue
 Ski patrol
 Surface water rescue
 Swiftwater rescue
 Urban search and rescue
 Vehicle extrication
 Wilderness search and rescue

Rescue operations require a high degree of training and are performed by rescue squads, either independent or part of larger organizations such as fire, police, military, first aid, or ambulance services.  In the U.S., they are usually staffed by medically trained personnel as NFPA regulations require it.

See also
 Animal rescue
 Civil defense
 Diver rescue
 Emergency management
 Extraction (military)
 International Rescue Corps
 Lifeboat (rescue)
 Rescue robot
 Technical rescue
 Vehicle extrication

References

External links